Toru "Tiger" Okoshi (born March 21, 1950) is an American jazz fusion trumpeter born in Ashiya, Japan.

After studying at Kwansei Gakuin University, Okoshi moved to the U.S. in 1972. In 1975 he completed studies at the Berklee College of Music. Okoshi collaborated in the 1970s with Gary Burton, and played with the Mike Gibbs Orchestra at Carnegie Hall in 1974. Following this he toured with Buddy Rich. In the early 1990s, he played in George Russell's Living Time Orchestra and recorded with Bob Moses. In the early 2000s he recorded several songs on the album Orpheus Again by Bruce Arnold.

Discography

As leader 
 Tiger's Baku (JVC, 1981) with Vinnie Colaiuta, Gerry Etkins, Steve Forman, Robert Gonzales, Quinous Johnson, Tim Landers, Mike Stern
 Mudd Cake (JVC, 1982)
 Face to Face (JVC, 1989) with Gerry Etkins, Rikiya Higashihara, Takayuki Hijikata, Koh Shimizu
 That Was Then, This Is Now (JVC, 1990) with Gerry Etkins, Rikiya Higashihara, Takayuki Hijikata, Koh Shimizu
 Echoes of a Note (JVC, 1993) with Jay Anderson, Peter Erskine, Béla Fleck, Gil Goldstein, Mike Stern
 Two Sides to Every Story (JVC, 1994) with Jack DeJohnette, Vic Firth, Gil Goldstein, Dave Holland, Mike Stern
 Color of Soil (JVC, 1998) with Jay Anderson, Kenny Barron, Mino Cinelu, Hank Roberts
 Plays Standard (Geneon, 2008)

As sideman
With Bruce Arnold
 Orpheus Again (2010)   
 With Dave Grusin NY-LA Dream Band (1983)

With Gary Burton
 Times Square (ECM, 1978)

With Lorraine Desmarais
 Live au Club Soda (2007)

References

1950 births
Living people
American jazz trumpeters
American male trumpeters
Japanese jazz trumpeters
21st-century trumpeters
21st-century American male musicians
American male jazz musicians